Víctor Romero (born 26 January 1979) is a Mexican former professional tennis player.

Biography
Romero grew up in Mexico City and was a top-50 ITF junior. Before turning professional he played college tennis in the United States for Tulane University, a private university in New Orleans, Louisiana. He represented Mexico at the 2005 Summer Universiade and won a mixed doubles silver medal.

On the professional tour he reached a best singles ranking of 395 in the world. As a doubles player he was runner-up in two ATP Challenger tournaments, both in 2006. He won 20 ITF satellite tournaments, 7 in singles and 13 in doubles.

Romero was a men's doubles bronze medalist for Mexico at the 2007 Pan American Games in Rio de Janeiro, partnering Santiago González.

During his career he featured in four Davis Cup ties for his native country and retired unbeaten, from one singles and three doubles rubbers.

Romero emigrated with his family to New Zealand in 2010. His wife, who he met while at Tulane University, is a New Zealander.

ATP Challenger and ITF Futures finals

Singles: 14 (7–7)

Doubles: 20 (13–7)

See also
List of Mexico Davis Cup team representatives

References

External links
 
 
 

1979 births
Living people
Mexican male tennis players
Universiade medalists in tennis
Pan American Games medalists in tennis
Pan American Games bronze medalists for Mexico
Tennis players at the 2007 Pan American Games
Tulane Green Wave men's tennis players
Tennis players from Mexico City
Universiade silver medalists for Mexico
Medalists at the 2005 Summer Universiade
Medalists at the 2007 Pan American Games